Cenne-Monestiés is a commune in the Aude department in southern France.

The film Departure (2015), starring Juliet Stevenson, Alex Lawther and Phénix Brossard, was filmed on location in the village.

Population

See also
Communes of the Aude department

References

Communes of Aude
Aude communes articles needing translation from French Wikipedia